Robin Roussel (born 26 August 1993) is a French professional golfer who plays on the European Tour. In May 2019, he won the Hauts de France – Pas de Calais Golf Openon the Challenge Tour.

Professional career
As an amateur, Roussel reached the final stage of the 2015 European Tour Q-school after a final round 62. Although he missed the cut in the final stage, he gained a place on the 2016 Challenge Tour. He turned professional before the start of the season. Roussel only made the cut in 5 of the 15 events he played and finished 149th in the Order of Merit.

At the end of 2016, he finished 6th the Alps Tour Q-school to gain a place on the tour for 2017. He had a successful season finishing runner-up in the Saint Malo Golf Open and joint runner-up in the Lignano Open. Together with five other top-10 finishes he finished fifth in the Order of Merit to gain a place on the Challenge Tour for 2018. Roussel's second season on the Challenge Tour was more successful than his first. He made the cut in 13 of 19 events with two top-10 finishes. He finished the season 75th in the Order of Merit to retain his card for 2019.

Roussel played in the early part of the 2019 MENA Tour season, finishing runner-up in the Ghala Golf Open and winning the Troon Series – Royal Golf Bahrain Open. Rousell had top-10 finishes in his first three Challenge Tour events and in June won the Hauts de France – Pas de Calais Golf Open. He was also runner-up in the Hainan Open and finished the 2019 season 7th in the Challenge Tour Order of Merit to earn a place on the 2020 European Tour.

Professional wins (4)

Challenge Tour wins (1)

MENA Tour wins (1)

French Tour wins (2)

See also
2019 Challenge Tour graduates

References

External links

French male golfers
Golfers from Paris
1993 births
Living people